Andrew Robertt is a New Zealand born actor. His work covers a diverse range of characters across multiple genres. He studied arts and sciences at The University of Auckland, and horticulture and business management at trade school. In his earlier work he was credited as Andrew Binns.

Filmography

Film
 Slow West (2015) .... Werner
 Field Punishment No. 1 (2014) (TV) .... CMO
 Pirates of the Airwaves (2014) (TV) .... William Cullen
 Siege (2012) (TV) .... Mike Burne
 Kidnapped (2005) (TV) .... Mr. Riach 
 Ike: Countdown to D-Day (2004) (TV) .... 101st Airborne Lieutenant (as Andrew Robertt)
 Deceit (2004) (TV) .... Ken Spradling (as Andrew Mitchell)
 Lucy (2003) (TV)  .... Bob Carroll Jr. (as Andrew Mitchell)
 You Wish! (2003) (TV) .... Stage Manager (as Andrew Binns)
 Murder in Greenwich (2002) (TV) .... Stephen Weeks (as Andrew Binns)
 Blood Crime (2002) (TV) .... Deputy David Forrest (as Andrew Binns)
 Lawless: Dead Evidence (2000) (TV) .... Graham Newby (as Andrew Binns)
 Topless Women Talk About Their Lives (1997) .... Geoff (as Andrew Binns)
 The End of the Golden Weather (1991) .... Joe Dyer (as Andrew Binns)
 An Angel at My Table (1990) .... Bruddie (as Andrew Binns)
 Ruby and Rata (1990) .... Salesman (as Andrew Binns)

TV series
 American Playboy: The Hugh Hefner Story (2017) .... James R. Thompson
 Making of the Mob: Chicago (2016) .... Frankie Yale
 Harry (2013) .... Axle
 Legend of the Seeker (2008) .... Ranssyn Fane 
 Amazing Extraordinary Friends (2006) .... The Wraith
 Orange Roughies (2006) .... Leo Sullivan
 Secret Agent Men (2003) .... Casper Gecko (2003–2004) (as Andrew Robertt)
 Mataku episode "The Rocks" (2002) .... Frank 
 Street Legal (2000) .... Det. Sr. Sgt. Jack Clifford (as Andrew Binns)
 Dark Knight (2000) .... Brack (as Andrew Binns)
 Duggan episode "Moving House" (1999) .... Peter Bergson (as Andrew Binns)
 The Legend of William Tell (1998) .... Xax (as Andrew Binns)
 Xena: Warrior Princess episode "Is There a Doctor in the House?" (1996) .... Hippocrates (as Andrew Binns)
 High Tide episode "The Runaways" (1995).... Danny Crenshaw
 Shortland Street (1992) .... Nurse Steve Mills (1992–1994) (as Andrew Binns)
 The New Adventures of Black Beauty (1990) .... Constable Carmody (as Andrew Binns)
 Betty's Bunch (1990) (as Andrew Binns)

Voice Overs
 Power Rangers Jungle Fury (2008) (voice) .... Rammer
 Power Rangers Mystic Force (2006) (voice) .... Morticon 
 Power Rangers SPD episode "Beginnings: Part 1" (2005) (voice) .... Alien 
 Power Rangers Dino Thunder episode "Golden Boy" (2004) (voice) .... Dysotron

References

External links
 
 http://www.tv.com/andrew-robertt/person/276952/summary.html

1969 births
New Zealand male film actors
New Zealand male television actors
New Zealand male soap opera actors
20th-century New Zealand male actors
21st-century New Zealand male actors
Living people